Rudolph Conse "Rudy" Hatfield II (born September 13, 1977) is an American-Filipino retired professional basketball player who  played for Laguna Lakers in the Metropolitan Basketball Association and for Tanduay Rhum Masters, Pop Cola Panthers, Coca-Cola Tigers and Barangay Ginebra San Miguel in the Philippine Basketball Association.

Pro career
After Hatfield's stint with Laguna Lakers in the Metropolitan Basketball Association, he was one of the two former MBA players signed by the Tanduay Rhum Masters beginning the 2000 PBA season. He played secondary role to Eric Menk and Sonny Alvarado. Hatfield was obtained by Pop Cola the following season in a trade with Noli Locsin which involved two other players.

He turned into Pop Cola's most reliable frontline player as he made it to the Mythical Second Team for the second straight year. Hatfield finished 14th in scoring with 13 points per game average.

Success with Coca-Cola
After playing for the Pop Cola Panthers, Hatfield was acquired by the Coca-Cola Tigers in 2002 and played with All-Stars Jeffrey Cariaso and Johnny Abarrientos. He became a power player here and helped the team win the 2002 All-Filipino Cup and the 2003 Reinforced Conference. He had a number of awards that include the Mythical and All-Defensive teams. He was also an All-Star in 2003.

Present 
Hatfield lives in Detroit, Michigan with his wife and six children.

References

External links
PBA profile

1977 births
Living people
American men's basketball players
Asian Games competitors for the Philippines
Barangay Ginebra San Miguel players
Basketball players at the 2002 Asian Games
Basketball players from Michigan
College men's basketball players in the United States
Philippine Basketball Association All-Stars
Philippines men's national basketball team players
Filipino men's basketball players
Pop Cola Panthers players
Powerade Tigers players
Power forwards (basketball)
Sportspeople from Kalamazoo, Michigan
Tanduay Rhum Masters players
University of Michigan–Dearborn alumni
American sportspeople of Filipino descent
Citizens of the Philippines through descent